Shannon Fill (born June 13, 1971, Texas, USA) is a former TV actress. Active from 1992 to 1995, she portrayed Sito Jaxa in Star Trek: The Next Generation episodes "The First Duty" (1992) and "Lower Decks" (1994).

Filmography
Deceived by Trust: A Moment of Truth Movie (1995) (TV) .... Cindy
Walker, Texas Ranger
"Collision Course" (1995) TV episode .... Dory
Silk Stalkings
"Reluctant Witness" (1994) TV episode .... Jennifer Lewis
Moment of Truth: Cradle of Conspiracy (1994) (TV) .... Pami
Star Trek: The Next Generation
"Lower Decks" (1994) TV episode .... Ensign Sito Jaxa
"The First Duty" (1992) TV episode .... Cadet Second Class Sito Jaxa
The Source of Suction (1994)
Freshman Dorm
"The Scarlett Letter" (1992) TV episode .... Christina
Murder, She Wrote
"Murder on Madison Avenue" (1992) TV episode .... Reporter
’’Walker, Texas Ranger’’
”Collision Course” (1995) TV episode …. Dory

Stage
In 1992, she played Ariel in the California Shakespeare Company's production of the Tempest.

In 1997, she played Natalie in the Pacific Resident Theatre of Venice California's production of the Jean Anouilh play Ardele.

Figure skating
Ladies Singles Free Skating in Los Angeles (Burbank), CA (1986)
1st Place: Southwest Pacific Regional Dance Championships, Pre-Intermediate Dance with partner Dana Goulston in Los Angeles (Burbank), CA (1987)

References

External links

1971 births
Actresses from Texas
American film actresses
American television actresses
California State University, Northridge alumni
Living people
21st-century American women